Malik is a commune in Andoung Meas District in north-east Cambodia. It contains four villages and has a population of 1,440. In the 2007 commune council elections, all five seats went to members of the Cambodian People's Party. The land alienation rate in Malik was moderate as of January 2006.

Villages

References

Communes of Ratanakiri province